Batanje is a village in the municipality of Karbinci, North Macedonia.

Demographics 
According to the 2002 census, the village had a total of 2 inhabitants. Ethnic groups in the village include:

 Macedonians 1
 Serbs 1

References 

Villages in Karbinci Municipality